Yana Urqu (Quechua yana black, urqu mountain, "black mountain", also spelled Yana Orco) is mountain in the Cordillera Central in the Andes of Peru which reaches a height of approximately . It is located in the Lima Region, Yauyos Province, on the border of the districts of Alis and  Laraos.

References 

Mountains of Lima Region
Mountains of Peru